Chawinda is a city located in Pasrur Tehsil, Sialkot District, Punjab, Pakistan.

Chawinda was the site of a key tank battle during the Indo-Pakistani War of 1965, where the Pakistani forces blocked the advance of the Indian Army which had thrust itself into the Sialkot district in an effort to thwart Pakistan's own advances into Indian-administered Kashmir. Tanks, aircrafta and other army vehicles are placed in the park of Chawinda city in the memory of battle.

References

Cities and towns in Sialkot District